Carpal tunnel syndrome (CTS) is the collection of symptoms and signs associated with median neuropathy at the carpal tunnel. Most CTS is related to idiopathic compression of the median nerve as it travels through the wrist at the carpal tunnel (IMNCT). Idiopathic means that there is no other disease process contributing to pressure on the nerve. As with most structural issues, it occurs in both hands, and the strongest risk factor is genetics.

Other conditions can cause CTS such as wrist fracture or rheumatoid arthritis. When CTS are diagnosed, they also may check for transthyretin amyloidosis. Transthyretin amyloidosis are often seen in conjunction vit CTS. After fracture, swelling, bleeding, and deformity compress the median nerve. With rheumatoid arthritis, the enlarged synovial lining of the tendons causes compression.

The main symptoms are numbness and tingling in the thumb, index finger, middle finger and the thumb side of the ring finger. People often report pain, but pain without tingling is not characteristic of IMNCT. Rather, the numbness can be so intense that it is described as painful.

Symptoms are typically most troublesome at night. Untreated, and over years to decades, IMNCT causes loss of sensibility and weakness and shrinkage (atrophy) of the muscles at the base of the thumb.

Work-related factors such as vibration, wrist extension or flexion, hand force, and repetition increase the risk of developing CTS. The only certain risk factor for IMNCT is genetics. All other risk factors are open to debate. It is important to consider IMNCT separately from CTS in diseases such as rheumatoid arthritis.

Diagnosis of IMNCT can be made with a high probability based on characteristic symptoms and signs. IMNCT can be measured with electrodiagnostic tests.

People wake less often at night if they wear a wrist splint. Injection of corticosteroids may or may not alleviate better than simulated (placebo) injections. There is no evidence that corticosteroid injection alters the natural history of the disease, which seems to be a gradual progression of neuropathy.

Surgery to cut the transverse carpal ligament is the only known disease modifying treatment.

Anatomy 

The carpal tunnel is an anatomical compartment located at the base of the palm. Nine flexor tendons and the median nerve pass through the carpal tunnel that is surrounded on three sides by the carpal bones that form an arch. The median nerve provides feeling or sensation to the thumb, index finger, long finger, and half of the ring finger. At the level of the wrist, the median nerve supplies the muscles at the base of the thumb that allow it to abduct, move away from the other four fingers, as well as move out of the plane of the palm. The carpal tunnel is located at the middle third of the base of the palm, bounded by the bony prominence of the scaphoid tubercle and trapezium at the base of the thumb, and the hamate hook that can be palpated along the axis of the ring finger. From the anatomical position, the carpal tunnel is bordered on the anterior surface by the transverse carpal ligament, also known as the flexor retinaculum. The flexor retinaculum is a strong, fibrous band that attaches to the pisiform and the hamulus of the hamate. The proximal boundary is the distal wrist skin crease, and the distal boundary is approximated by a line known as Kaplan's cardinal line. This line uses surface landmarks, and is drawn between the apex of the skin fold between the thumb and index finger to the palpated hamate hook.

Pathophysiology 

The median nerve can be compressed by a decrease in the size of the canal, an increase in the size of the contents (such as the swelling of tissue around the flexor tendons), or both. When the pressure builds up inside the tunnel, it damages the median nerve (median neuropathy).

As the median neuropathy gets worse, there is loss of sensibility in the thumb, index, middle, and thumb side of the ring finger. As the neuropathy progresses, there may be first weakness, then to atrophy of the muscles of thenar eminence (the flexor pollicis brevis, opponens pollicis, and abductor pollicis brevis). The sensibility of the palm remains normal because the superficial sensory branch of the median nerve branches proximal to the TCL and travels superficial to it.

The role of nerve adherence is speculative.

Epidemiology 
IMNCT is estimated to affect one out of ten people during their lifetime and is the most common nerve compression syndrome. There is notable variation in such estimates based on how one defines the problem, in particular whether one studies people presenting with symptoms vs. measurable median neuropathy (IMNCT) whether or not people are seeking care. It accounts for about 90% of all nerve compression syndromes. The best data regarding IMNCT and CTS comes from population-based studies, which demonstrate no relationship to gender, and increasing prevalence (accumulation) with age.

Symptoms 
The characteristic symptom of CTS is numbness, tingling, or burning sensations in the thumb, index, middle, and radial half of the ring finger. These areas process sensation through the median nerve. Numbness or tingling is usually worse with sleep. People tend to sleep with their wrists flexed, which increases pressure on the nerve. Ache and discomfort may be reported in the forearm or even the upper arm, but its relationship to IMNCT is uncertain. Symptoms that are not characteristic of CTS include pain in the wrists or hands, loss of grip strength, minor loss of sleep, and loss of manual dexterity.

Median nerve symptoms may arise from compression at the level of the thoracic outlet or the area where the median nerve passes between the two heads of the pronator teres in the forearm, although this is debated.

Signs 
Severe IMNCT is associated with measurable loss of sensibility.  Diminished threshold sensibility (the ability to distinguish different amounts of pressure) can be measured using Semmes-Weinstein monofilament testing. Diminished discriminant sensibility can be measured by testing two-point discrimination: the number of millimeters two points of contact need to be separated before you can distinguish them.

A person with idiopathic median neuropathy at the carpal tunnel will not have any sensory loss over the thenar eminence (bulge of muscles in the palm of hand and at the base of the thumb). This is because the palmar branch of the median nerve, which innervates that area of the palm, separates from the median nerve and passes over the carpal tunnel.

Severe IMNCT is also associated with weakness and atrophy of the muscles at the base of the thumb.  People may lose the ability to palmarly abduct the thumb. IMNCT can be detected on examination using one of several maneuvers to provoke paresthesia (a sensation of tingling or "pins and needles" in the median nerve distribution).  These so-called provocative signs include:
 Phalen's maneuver. Performed by fully flexing the wrist, then holding this position and awaiting symptoms. A positive test is one that results in paresthesia in the median nerve distribution within sixty seconds.
 Tinel's sign is performed by lightly tapping the median nerve just proximal to flexor retinaculum to elicit paresthesia.
 Durkan test, carpal compression test, or applying firm pressure to the palm over the nerve for up to 30 seconds to elicit paresthesia.
 Hand elevation test The hand elevation test is performed by lifting both hands above the head. Paresthesia in the median nerve distribution within 2 minutes is considered positive.

Diagnostic performance characteristics such as sensitivity and specificity are reported, but difficult to interpret because of the lack of a consensus reference standard for CTS or IMNCT.

Causes

Idiopathic Median Neuropathy at the Carpal Tunnel 

Most people with CTS have median neuropathy of unknown cause. The medical term for this is “idiopathic.”  The pathology can be described as idiopathic median neuropathy at the carpal tunnel (IMNCT).

Genetic factors are believed to be the most important determinants of who develops carpal tunnel syndrome due to IMNCT. In other words, one's wrist structure seems programmed at birth to develop IMNCT later in life. A genome-wide association study (GWAS) of carpal tunnel syndrome identified 16 genomic loci significantly associated with the disease, including several loci previously known to be associated with human height.

Factors that may contribute to symptoms, but have not been experimentally associated with neuropathy include obesity, and Diabetes mellitus . One case-control study noted that individuals classified as obese (BMI > 29) are 2.5 times more likely than slender individuals (BMI < 20) to be diagnosed with CTS. It's not clear whether this association is due to an alteration of pathophysiology, a variation in symptoms, or a variation in care-seeking.

Discrete Pathophysiology and Carpal Tunnel Syndrome 

Hereditary neuropathy with susceptibility to pressure palsies is a genetic condition that appears to increase the probability of developing MNCT. Heterozygous mutations in the gene SH3TC2, associated with Charcot-Marie-Tooth, may confer susceptibility to neuropathy, including CTS.

Association between common benign tumors such as lipomas, ganglion, and vascular malformation should be handled with care. Such tumors are very common and overlap with IMNCT is more likely than pressure on the median nerve. Similarly, the degree to which transthyretin amyloidosis-associated polyneuropathy and carpal tunnel syndrome is under investigation. Prior carpal tunnel release is often noted in individuals who later present with transthyretin amyloid-associated cardiomyopathy. There is consideration that bilateral carpal tunnel syndrome could be a reason to consider amyloidosis, timely diagnosis of which could improve heart health. Amyloidosis is rare, even among people with carpal tunnel syndrome (0.55% incidence within 10 years of carpal tunnel release). In the absence of other factors associated with a notable probability of amyloidosis, it's not clear that biopsy at the time of carpal tunnel release has a suitable balance between potential harms and potential benefits.

Other specific pathophysiologies that can cause median neuropathy via pressure include:
 Rheumatoid arthritis and other diseases that cause inflammation of the flexor tendons.
 With severe untreated hypothyroidism, generalized myxedema causes deposition of mucopolysaccharides within both the perineurium of the median nerve, as well as the tendons passing through the carpal tunnel. Association of CTS and IMNCT with lesser degrees of hypothyroidism is questioned.
 Pregnancy may bring out symptoms in genetically predisposed individuals.  Perhaps the changes in hormones and fluid increase pressure temporarily in the carpal tunnel. High progesterone levels and water retention may increase the size of  the synovium.
 Bleeding and swelling from a fracture or dislocation. This is referred to as acute carpal tunnel syndrome.
 Acromegaly causes excessive secretion of growth hormones. This causes the soft tissues and bones around the carpal tunnel to grow and compress the median nerve.
Other considerations

 Double-crush syndrome is a debated hypothesis that compression or irritation of nerve branches contributing to the median nerve in the neck, or anywhere above the wrist, increases sensitivity of the nerve to compression in the wrist. There is little evidence to support this theory and some concern that it may be used to justify more surgery.

Median Neuropathy and Activity 
Work-related factors that increase risk of CTS include vibration (5.4 effect ratio), hand force (4.2), and repetition (2.3). Exposure to wrist extension or flexion at work increases the risk of CTS by two times. The balance of evidence suggests that keyboard and computer use does not cause CTS.

The international debate regarding the relationship between CTS and repetitive hand use (at work in particular) is ongoing. The Occupational Safety and Health Administration (OSHA) has adopted rules and regulations regarding so-called "cumulative trauma disorders" based concerns regarding potential harm from exposure to repetitive tasks, force, posture, and vibration.

A review of available scientific data by the National Institute for Occupational Safety and Health (NIOSH) indicated that job tasks that involve highly repetitive manual acts or specific wrist postures were associated with symptoms of CTS, but there was not a clear distinction of paresthesia (appropriate) from pain (inappropriate) and causation was not established. The distinction from work-related arm pains that are not carpal tunnel syndrome was unclear. It is proposed that repetitive use of the arm can affect the biomechanics of the upper limb or cause damage to tissues. It is proposed that postural and spinal assessment along with ergonomic assessments should be considered, based on observation that addressing these factors has been found to improve comfort in some studies although experimental data are lacking and the perceived benefits may not be specific to those interventions. A 2010 survey by NIOSH showed that 2/3 of the 5 million carpal tunnel diagnosed in the US that year were related to work. Women are more likely to be diagnosed with work-related carpal tunnel syndrome than men.

Associated conditions 
A variety of patient factors can lead to CTS, including heredity, size of the carpal tunnel, associated local and systematic diseases, and certain habits. Non-traumatic causes generally happen over a period of time, and are not triggered by one certain event. Many of these factors are manifestations of physiologic aging.

Diagnosis 
There is no consensus reference standard for the diagnosis of carpal tunnel syndrome. A combination of characteristic symptoms (how it feels) and signs (what the clinician finds on exam) are associated with a high probability of IMNCT without electrophysiological testing.

Electrodiagnostic testing (electromyography and nerve conduction velocity) can objectively measure and verify median neuropathy.

Ultrasound can image and measure the cross sectional diameter of the median nerve, which has some correlation with idiopathic median neuropathy at the carpal tunnel (IMNCT). The role of ultrasound in diagnosis--just as for electrodiagnostic testing--is a matter of debate. EDX cannot fully exclude the diagnosis of CTS due to the lack of sensitivity. A joint report published by the American Association of Neuromuscular & Electrodiagnostic Medicine (AANEM), the American Academy of Physical Medicine and Rehabilitation (AAPM&R), and the American Academy of Neurology defines practice parameters, standards, and guidelines for EDX studies of CTS based on an extensive critical literature review. This joint review concluded median and sensory nerve conduction studies are valid and reproducible in a clinical laboratory setting and a clinical diagnosis of CTS can be made with a sensitivity greater than 85% and specificity greater than 95%. Given the key role of electrodiagnostic testing in the diagnosis of CTS, The AANEM has issued evidence-based practice guidelines, both for the diagnosis of carpal tunnel syndrome.

Electrodiagnostic testing (electromyography and nerve conduction velocity) can objectively verify the median nerve dysfunction. Normal nerve conduction studies, however, do not exclude the diagnosis of CTS. Clinical assessment by history taking and physical examination can support a diagnosis of CTS. If clinical suspicion of CTS is high, treatment should be initiated despite normal electrodiagnostic testing.

The role of confirmatory electrodiagnostic testing is debated. The goal of electrodiagnostic testing is to compare the speed of conduction in the median nerve with conduction in other nerves supplying the hand. When the median nerve is compressed, as in IMNCT, it will conduct more slowly than normal and more slowly than other nerves. Compression results in damage to the myelin sheath and manifests as delayed latencies and slowed conduction velocities. There are many electrodiagnostic tests used to make a diagnosis of CTS, but the most sensitive, specific, and reliable test is the Combined Sensory Index (also known as the Robinson index). Electrodiagnosis rests upon demonstrating impaired median nerve conduction across the carpal tunnel in context of normal conduction elsewhere. It is often stated that normal electrodiagnostic studies do not preclude the diagnosis of carpal tunnel syndrome. The rational for this is that a threshold of neuropathy must be reached before study results become abnormal and also that threshold values for abnormality vary. Others contend that idiopathic median neuropathy at the carpal tunnel with normal electrodiagnostic tests would represent very, very mild neuropathy that would be best managed as a normal median nerve. Even more important, notable symptoms with mild disease is strongly associated with unhelpful thoughts and symptoms of worry and despair. Notable CTS with unmeasurable IMNCT should remind clinicians to always consider the whole person, including their mindset and circumstances, in strategies to help people get and stay healthy.

Imaging 
The role of MRI or ultrasound imaging in the diagnosis of idiopathic median neuropathy at the carpal tunnel (IMNCT) is unclear. Their routine use is not recommended. MRI has high sensitivity but low specificity for IMNCT. High signal intensity may suggest accumulation of axonal transportation, myelin sheath degeneration or oedema.

Differential diagnosis 
There are few disorders on the differential diagnosis for carpal tunnel syndrome. Cervical radiculopathy can also cause paresthesia abnormal sensibility in the hands and wrist. The distribution usually follows the nerve root, and the paresthesia may be provoked by neck movement. Electromyography and imaging of the cervical spine can help to differentiate cervical radiculopathy from carpal tunnel syndrome if the diagnosis is unclear. Carpal tunnel syndrome is sometimes applied as a label to anyone with pain, numbness, swelling, or burning in the radial side of the hands or wrists. When pain is the primary symptom, carpal tunnel syndrome is unlikely to be the source of the symptoms.

When the symptoms and signs point to atrophy and muscle weakness more than numbness, consider neurodegenerative disorders such as Amyotrophic Lateral Sclerosis or Charcot-Marie Tooth.

Prevention 
There is little or no data to support the concept that activity adjustment prevents carpal tunnel syndrome. The evidence for wrist rest is debated. There is also little research supporting that ergonomics is related to carpal tunnel syndrome. Due to risk factors for hand and wrist dysfunction being multifactorial and very complex it is difficult to assess the true physical factors of carpal tunnel syndrome.

Biological factors such as genetic predisposition and anthropometric features are more strongly associated with idiopathic carpal tunnel syndrome than occupational/environmental factors such as hand use.

Treatment 
CTS related to another pathophysiology is addressed by treating that pathology. For instance, disease-modifying medications for rheumatoid arthritis or surgery for traumatic acute carpal tunnel syndrome.

Generally accepted treatments include: physiotherapy, steroids either orally or injected locally, splinting, and surgical release of the transverse carpal ligament. Limited evidence suggests that gabapentin is no more effective than placebo for CTS treatment. There is insufficient evidence to recommend therapeutic ultrasound, yoga, acupuncture, low level laser therapy, vitamin B6, myofascial release, and any form of stretch or exercise. Change in activity may include avoiding activities that worsen symptoms.

The American Academy of Orthopedic Surgeons recommends proceeding conservatively with a course of nonsurgical therapies tried before release surgery is considered. A different treatment should be tried if the current treatment fails to resolve the symptoms within 2 to 7 weeks. Early surgery with carpal tunnel release is indicated where there is evidence of median nerve denervation or a person elects to proceed directly to surgical treatment. Recommendations may differ when carpal tunnel syndrome is found in association with the following conditions: diabetes mellitus, coexistent cervical radiculopathy, hypothyroidism, polyneuropathy, pregnancy, rheumatoid arthritis, and carpal tunnel syndrome in the workplace.

Splint Immobilizations 

The importance of wrist braces and splints in the carpal tunnel syndrome therapy is known, but many people are unwilling to use braces. In 1993, The American Academy of Neurology recommended a non-invasive treatment for the CTS at the beginning (except for sensitive or motor deficit or grave report at EMG/ENG): a therapy using splints was indicated for light and moderate pathology. Current recommendations generally don't suggest immobilizing braces, but instead activity modification and non-steroidal anti-inflammatory drugs as initial therapy, followed by more aggressive options or specialist referral if symptoms do not improve.

Many health professionals suggest that, for the best results, one should wear braces at night. When possible, braces can be worn during the activity primarily causing stress on the wrists. The brace should not generally be used during the day as wrist activity is needed to keep the wrist from becoming stiff and to prevent muscles from weakening.

Corticosteroids 
Corticosteroid injections may provide temporary alleviation of symptoms although they are not clearly better than placebo. This form of treatment is thought to reduce discomfort in those with CTS due to its ability to decrease median nerve swelling. The use of ultrasound while performing the injection is more expensive but leads to faster resolution of CTS symptoms. The injections are done under local anesthesia. This treatment is not appropriate for extended periods, however. In general, local steroid injections are only used until more definitive treatment options can be used. Corticosteroid injections do not appear to slow disease progression.

Surgery 

Release of the transverse carpal ligament is known as "carpal tunnel release" surgery. It is recommended when there is static (constant, not just intermittent) numbness, muscle weakness, or atrophy, and when night-splinting or other palliative interventions no longer alleviate intermittent symptoms. The surgery may be done with local or regional anesthesia with or without sedation, or under general anesthesia. In general, milder cases can be controlled for months to years, but severe cases are unrelenting symptomatically and are likely to result in surgical treatment.

Surgery is more beneficial in the short term to alleviate symptoms (up to six months) than wearing an orthosis for a minimum of six weeks. However, surgery and wearing a brace resulted in similar symptom relief in the long term (12–18 month outcomes).

Physical therapy 

An evidence-based guideline produced by the American Academy of Orthopedic Surgeons assigned various grades of recommendation to physical therapy and other nonsurgical treatments. One of the primary issues with physiotherapy is that it attempts to reverse (often) years of pathology inside the carpal tunnel. Self-myofascial ligament stretching can be an easy, do-at-home, treatment to help alleviate symptoms. Self-myofascial stretching involves stretching the carpal ligament for 30 seconds, 6 times a day for about 6 weeks. Many patients report improvements in symptoms such as pain, function, and nerve conduction. Practitioners caution that any physiotherapy such as myofascial release may take weeks of persistent application to effectively manage carpal tunnel syndrome.

Again, some claim that pro-active ways to reduce stress on the wrists, which alleviates wrist pain and strain, involve adopting a more ergonomic work and life environment. For example, some have claimed that switching from a QWERTY computer keyboard layout to a more optimised ergonomic layout such as Dvorak was commonly cited as beneficial in early CTS studies; however, some meta-analyses of these studies claim that the evidence that they present is limited.

Tendon and nerve gliding exercises appear to be useful in carpal tunnel syndrome.

A randomized control trial published in 2017 sought to examine the efficacy of manual therapy techniques for the treatment of carpal tunnel syndrome. The study included a total of 140 individuals diagnosed with carpal tunnel syndrome and the patients were divided into two groups. One group received treatment that consisted of manual therapy. Manual therapy included the incorporation of specified neurodynamic techniques, functional massage, and carpal bone mobilizations. Another group only received treatment through electrophysical modalities. The duration of the study was over the course of 20 physical therapy sessions for both groups. Results of this study showed that the group being treated through manual techniques and mobilizations yielded a 290% reduction in overall pain when compared to reports of pain prior to conducting the study. Total function improved by 47%. Conversely, the group being treated with electrophysical modalities reported a 47% reduction in overall pain with a 9% increase in function.

Alternative medicine 
A 2018 Cochrane review on acupuncture and related interventions for the treatment of carpal tunnel syndrome concluded that, "Acupuncture and laser acupuncture may have little or no effect in the short term on symptoms of carpal tunnel syndrome (CTS) in comparison with placebo or sham acupuncture." It was also noted that all studies had an unclear or high overall risk of bias and that all evidence was of low or very low quality.

Prognosis 

The natural history of untreated IMNCT seems to be gradual worsening of the neuropathy. It is difficult to prove that this is always the case, but the supportive evidence is compelling. 

Those that undergo a carpal tunnel release are nearly twice as likely as those not having surgery to develop trigger thumb in the months following the procedure.

Paresthesia may increase after release of advanced carpal tunnel syndrome, and people may feel worse than they did prior to surgery for many months.

Troublesome recovery seems related to symptoms of worry (anxiety) or despair (depression), and unhelpful thoughts about symptoms (such as worst-case or catastrophic thinking) as well as advanced neuropathy with potentially permanent neuropathy. 

Recurrence of carpal tunnel syndrome after successful surgery is rare. Caution is warranted in considering additional surgery for people dissatisfied with the result of carpal tunnel release as perceived recurrence may more be often due to renewed awareness of persistent symptoms rather than worsening pathology.

History 
IMNCT was described long ago, but infrequently diagnosed until relatively recently.  People were often diagnosed with acroparesthesia. Clinicians would often ascribe it to “poor circulation” and not pursue it further.

Sir James Paget described median nerve compression at the carpal tunnel in two patients after trauma in 1854. The first was due to an injury where a cord had been wrapped around a man's wrist. The second was related to a distal radial fracture. For the first case Paget performed an amputation of the hand. For the second case Paget recommended a wrist splint.

The first to notice the association between the carpal ligament pathology and median nerve compression appear to have been Pierre Marie and Charles Foix in 1913. They described the results of a postmortem of an 80-year-old man with bilateral carpal tunnel syndrome. They suggested that division of the carpal ligament would be curative in such cases. Putman had previously described a series of 37 patients and suggested a vasomotor origin. The association between the thenar muscle atrophy and compression was noted in 1914. The name "carpal tunnel syndrome" appears to have been coined by Moersch in 1938.

Physician George S. Phalen of the Cleveland Clinic drew attention to the pathology of IMNCT as the reason for most CTS after working with a group of patients in the 1950s and 1960s.

Treatment

In 1933 Sir James Learmonth outlined a method of decompression of the nerve at the wrist. This procedure appears to have been pioneered by the Canadian surgeons Herbert Galloway and Andrew MacKinnon in 1924 in Winnipeg but was not published. Endoscopic release was described in 1988.

See also 
 Repetitive strain injury
 Tarsal tunnel syndrome
 Ulnar nerve entrapment

References

External links 

 Carpal Tunnel Syndrome Fact Sheet (National Institute of Neurological Disorders and Stroke) 
 NHS website carpal-tunnel.net provides a free to use, validated, online self diagnosis questionnaire for CTS
 

Mononeuropathies of upper limb
Physical ergonomics
Syndromes affecting the nervous system
Wikipedia medicine articles ready to translate
Wikipedia emergency medicine articles ready to translate